Menshikov Island (Ostrov Men'shikova) is an island in the Sea of Okhotsk located east of the Shantar Islands.

Geography
Menshikov Island  lies 71 km to the east of the eastern shore of Kusov Island, the easternmost island of the Shantar group. It is 7 km long and has a maximum width of 1.6 km. It was named after one of the ships of the 1849-1855 Amur Expedition, which had been named after Admiral A.S. Menshikov.

Administratively this island belongs to the Khabarovsk Krai of the Russian Federation.

History

American whaleships sent whaleboats to the island to collect eggs from seabirds. They called it Bird Island.

References

External links
Geographical coordinates of the points defining the position of the straight baselines for measuring the breadth of the territorial sea, the economic zone and the continental shelf of the USSR off the continental coastline and islands of the Pacific Ocean, the Sea of Japan, the Sea of Okhotsk and the Bering Sea

Islands of the Sea of Okhotsk
Islands of the Russian Far East
Islands of Khabarovsk Krai
Uninhabited islands of Russia